Judson Independent School District (Or JISD) is a public school district based in Live Oak, Texas (USA).

In 2009, the school district was rated "academically acceptable" by the Texas Education Agency.

On November 18, 2011, June Adair was elected school board president, replacing Jose Macias.

Schools

High schools (Grades 9-12)
Judson High (Converse) - opened 1959
Karen Wagner High (Bexar County) - opened 2005
Judson Early College Academy (Live Oak) - opened 2009
Judson Learning Academy (Converse)
Veterans Memorial High (Bexar County) - opened 2016

Middle schools (Grades 6-8)
[[JSTEM Academy (Converse)
Judson Middle (Converse)
Kirby Middle (San Antonio)
Kitty Hawk Middle (Universal City)
Metzger Middle (San Antonio) 
Woodlake Hills Middle (San Antonio)

Alternative schools
Judson Secondary Alternative School

Elementary schools
Grades PK-5
Candlewood Elementary (Bexar County)
Converse Elementary (Converse)
Coronado Village Elementary (Universal City) Opened in August 1972
Ed Franz Elementary (Live Oak)
Escondido Elementary (Converse) - Opened 2017
Hartman Elementary (San Antonio)
Hopkins Elementary (Kirby)
Park Village Elementary (San Antonio)
Paschall Elementary (San Antonio)
Masters Elementary (Bexar County)
Wortham Oaks Elementary (Bexar County) - Opened 2018
Grades K-5
Crestview Elementary (Live Oak)
Copperfield Elementary (Converse) Opened in August 2014
Elolf Elementary (Converse)
Miller's Point Elementary (Converse)
Olympia Elementary (Universal City)
Salinas Elementary (Universal City)
Spring Meadows Elementary (Bexar County)
Woodlake Elementary (Bexar County)
Rolling Meadows Elementary (San Antonio)

References

External links

 
School districts in Bexar County, Texas